Hugh Homer (born 23 November 1935) is a Trinidad and Tobago former sports shooter. He competed in the 50 metre rifle, prone event at the 1968 Summer Olympics.

References

1935 births
Living people
Trinidad and Tobago male sport shooters
Olympic shooters of Trinidad and Tobago
Shooters at the 1968 Summer Olympics
Sportspeople from Port of Spain